Historically Speaking is an album by American pianist, composer and bandleader Duke Ellington recorded for the Bethlehem label in 1956. The album features updated arrangements of many of Ellington's early compositions.

Reception
Allmusic awarded the album 2 stars.

Track listing
All compositions by Duke Ellington except as indicated
 "East St. Louis Toodle-o" (Ellington, James "Bubber" Miley) - 3:30
 "Creole Love Call" (Ellington, Miley) - 3:47  
 "Stompy Jones" - 3:53  
 "The Jeep Is Jumpin'" (Ellington, Johnny Hodges, Billy Strayhorn) - 2:25  
 "Jack the Bear" - 3:20  
 "In a Mellow Tone" (Ellington, Milt Gabler) - 2:54  
 "Ko-Ko" - 2:18
 "Midriff" (Strayhorn) - 3:52  
 "Stomp, Look and Listen" - 2:41  
 "Unbooted Character" - 4:18  
 "Lonesome Lullaby" - 3:19  
 "Upper Manhattan Medical Group" (Strayhorn) - 3:09 
Recorded at Universal Recording Corp., Chicago on February 7 & 8, 1956.

Personnel
Duke Ellington – piano
Cat Anderson, Willie Cook, Ray Nance, Clark Terry - trumpet
Quentin Jackson, Britt Woodman - trombone
John Sanders - valve trombone
Jimmy Hamilton - clarinet, tenor saxophone
Johnny Hodges - alto saxophone 
Russell Procope - alto saxophone, clarinet
Paul Gonsalves - tenor saxophone
Harry Carney - baritone saxophone
Jimmy Woode - bass 
Sam Woodyard - drums

References

Bethlehem Records albums
Duke Ellington albums
1956 albums